Jan Fadrný (born June 14, 1980) is a Czech former professional ice hockey center. Fadrný was drafted by the Pittsburgh Penguins in the 6th round (169th overall) in the 1998 NHL Entry Draft.

Awards
2002-03 Czech Extraliga Champion, HC Slavia Praha

External links

1980 births
Living people
Czech ice hockey centres
VHK Vsetín players
HC Slavia Praha players
Motor České Budějovice players
HC Kometa Brno players
Pittsburgh Penguins draft picks
Wilkes-Barre/Scranton Penguins players
Saale Bulls Halle players
Ice hockey people from Brno
Neuchâtel Young Sprinters HC players
Czech expatriate ice hockey players in Canada
Czech expatriate ice hockey players in the United States
Czech expatriate ice hockey players in Switzerland
Czech expatriate ice hockey players in Germany
Czech expatriate ice hockey players in Slovakia
Czech expatriate sportspeople in Romania
Expatriate ice hockey players in Romania